Lanre Buraimoh is a Nigerian-born artist who is based in Texas, US. His "bead paintings" are exhibited internationally.

Art work
Buraimoh received his art training from his parents, Chief Jimoh Buraimoh and Alake Buraimoh, both celebrated contemporary artists well known in Nigeria and abroad. Lanre Buraimoh's artwork is inspired by the beadwork of the Yoruba people of West Africa, who have traditionally incorporated beads in their art forms and to decorate the crowns, shoes and walking sticks of their kings. Buraimoh's innovative pieces adapt this tradition to the more contemporary art form of "bead painting." His paintings are adorned with thousands of small, colorful glass beads that depict Yoruba objects and symbols, including drums and native drummers, masks, lizards, foxes and the Shankofa bird—a mythical bird with an egg in its mouth that is shown flying forward while looking backward. The egg "represents the knowledge of the past upon which wisdom is based and also signifies the future." Buraimoh's pieces also reflect traditional Yoruba beliefs about love, entertainment, and unity.

Awards 

 2019, Houston Artadia Fellowship
 2017, Juror's Award at the University Museum at Texas Southern University

Exhibitions 

 2019, 19th Annual Citywide Exhibition, University Museum at Texas Southern University, Houston, Texas
 2019, Summer Group Art Show, Wasagaming Art Center, Manitoba, Canada
 2017, Art of Africa, Mytrunk Gallery, Denmark
2012, 12th Annual Citywide Exhibition, University Museum at Texas Southern University, Houston, Texas

References

External links
   Non Profit Organization featuring Lanre Buraimoh's work
   College featuring artwork
 Compass Newspaper Article

1976 births
Living people
People from Osun State
People from Osogbo
Yoruba artists
Nigerian artists
Ambrose Alli University alumni
Alumni of the Webber Douglas Academy of Dramatic Art
Nigerian expatriates in the United States